Richard Dix (17 January 1924 – 2 July 1990) was an English professional footballer who played as a left winger.

Career
Dix was born in South Shields in 1924. Dix played for South Shields United. North Shields, Bradford Park Avenue, King's Lynn, Bradford City, Goole Town. Dartford and Scarborough.

He played for Bradford City between August 1952 and July 1953, scoring 1 goal in 8 appearances in the Football League for them.

Sources

References

1924 births
1990 deaths
English footballers
North Shields F.C. players
Bradford (Park Avenue) A.F.C. players
King's Lynn F.C. players
Bradford City A.F.C. players
Goole Town F.C. players
Dartford F.C. players
Scarborough F.C. players
English Football League players
Footballers from South Shields
Place of death missing
Association football wingers